Nirbhay N. Singh is a psychologist who has been a professor at many  universities and has served as editor-in-chief of several psychology journals, and founding editor of multiple journals that include Mindfulness. Singh received graduate education in New Zealand and has held academic posts in the United States.

Education and personal life
Singh received a master's degree in psychology (1974) and a doctoral degree in psychology (1978) from the University of Auckland in New Zealand. His doctoral thesis was titled Attentional responses during discrimination learning by retarded children. Singh is also a doctoral-level Board Certified Behavior Analyst (BCBA-D).

In a published profile in 2018, Singh reported having had a life-long practice of meditation in the Soto Zen tradition, and has also received training in other Hindu and Buddhist methods of meditation.

Editor

Editor: journals
Singh was the founding editor of Mindfulness  (2010-), a journal he continued to edit as of 2018.
Singh has also been the editor of the Journal of Child and Family Studies, which he also continued to edit in 2018.
Furthermore, he has served as the founding editor of Advances in Neurodevelopmental Disorders (2017-), which he continued to edit in 2018.
Earlier he edited Journal of Behavioral Education.

Editor: book series
As of 2018, Singh was the editor of three-book series: Mindfulness in Behavioral Health, Evidence-based Practice in Behavioral Health, and Children and Families.

Academic posts

Singh has been a professor of psychiatry, Pediatrics and Psychology at the Virginia Commonwealth University School of Medicine, where he was also Director of the Commonwealth Institute for Family Studies, Richmond, Virginia. 
Singh has served as Clinical Professor of Psychiatry and Health Behavior at the Medical College of Georgia, Augusta University (formerly named Georgia Regents University), where he now adjunct professor of psychiatry at Augusta University.

Publications
Singh has contributed more than 680 publications, including books, book chapters, and peer-reviewed papers. Some of his books are listed here:

Edited books on meditation or mindfulness:

 

Edited books on developmental or child psychology:

Edited books (other):

References

External links
 Speaker profile (Emedevents) with photograph

Living people
21st-century American psychologists
University of Auckland alumni
Year of birth missing (living people)